The Luxembourg Women's Volleyball Championship or ( Novotel Ligue 1 Women's Volleyball ) for sponsorship reasons is an annual competition for women's volleyball teams in Luxembourg. It has been held since 1958. 
Competitions are held in three divisions - National League, Division 1 and Division 2. The championships are organized by the ' Luxembourg Volleyball Federation'.

Competition formula (National League)
The National League championship is played in two stages - preliminary and playoffs. In the preliminary stage the teams play in two rounds. According to the results 4 teams qualify for the playoffs and by elimination system determine the two finalists, who play for the championship. Series of matches are played until two victories of one of the opponents.
For victories 3-0 and 3-1 teams get 3 points, for victories 3-2 - 2 points, for defeat 2-3 - 1 point, for defeat 0-3 and 1-3 no points are awarded. 
There were eight teams in the 2021/22 National League Championship: "Valfer" (Valferdange), "GIM Volley Bonnvois" (Luxembourg), "Mamer", "Steinfort", "Petange", "Bertrange", "Diekirch", "Fentange". Walpher won the championship title by defeating GIM Walleye Bonnvois 2-0 (3-1, 3–0) in the final series. Third place went to Steinfort.

List of winners

References

External links
 Luxembourg Volleyball Federation

Luxembourg League
1958 establishments in Luxembourg
Volleyball in Luxembourg
Luxembourg League